Asplenium dielerectum is a fern, a member of the spleenwort family. It is critically endangered.

Description 
It has  three to nine lance-shaped fronds, around 20 to 70 cm long.

Distribution 
It is endemic to the Hawaiian Islands.

Taxonomy 
It was named by Ronald Louis Leo Viane.

References

External links 
 https://www.pteridoportal.org/portal/taxa/index.php?tid=8809

dielerectum
Endemic flora of Hawaii